Izabela Lojna (born 11 May 1992) is a Croatian football midfielder currently playing in the Croatian First Division for Osijek, with which she has also played the Champions League.

International career
Lojna is a member of the Croatian national team; she debuted in May 2010 against Serbia.

International goals

References

External links

1992 births
Living people
Croatian women's footballers
Croatia women's international footballers
Women's association football midfielders
Croatian Women's First Football League players
ŽNK Osijek players